WKTZ-FM is a Classic Hits formatted broadcast radio station licensed to Loch Lynn Heights, Maryland, serving Oakland and Westernport in Maryland and Terra Alta and Keyser in West Virginia.  WKTZ-FM is owned and operated by Broadcast Communications, Inc.  WKTZ-FM currently simulcasts sister station WMSG.

References

External links
 Classic Hits Z95.9
 

1979 establishments in West Virginia

Classic hits radio stations in the United States
Radio stations established in 1979
KTZ-FM